William Ronald Plager (July 6, 1945 — January 3, 2016) was a Canadian professional ice hockey defenceman.

Plager started his National Hockey League (NHL) career with the Minnesota North Stars in 1967. He also played for the St. Louis Blues and Atlanta Flames. He left the NHL after the 1976 season.

Personal life
Before playing in the National Hockey League, Plager played for the Peterborough Petes in Peterborough, Ontario, where he met his wife Donna Hickey. After retiring from the NHL, Plager returned to Peterborough with Donna, sons William Jr., Brett and daughter Dara. Plager is the brother of former NHL players/coaches Bob Plager and Barclay Plager. All three played together for four seasons with the St. Louis Blues.

Plager retired from hockey and became a manager at Quaker Oats Peterborough plant and was head coach of Atom B/C IceKats, girls hockey teams in the Peterborough Girls Hockey Association. He died on January 3, 2016.

Career statistics

Regular season and playoffs

Transactions
 Traded to Minnesota by Montreal with the rights to Barrie Meissner and Leo Thiffault for Bryan Watson, June 6, 1967.
 Claimed by NY Rangers from Minnesota in Intra-League Draft, June 12, 1968.
 Traded to St. Louis by NY Rangers with Camille Henry and Robbie Irons for Don Caley and Wayne Rivers, June 13, 1968.
 Claimed by Atlanta from St. Louis in Expansion Draft, June 6, 1972.
 Claimed by Minnesota from Atlanta in Intra-League Draft, June 12, 1973.

Awards and achievements
 AHL Second All-Star Team (1975)

References

External links
 

1945 births
2016 deaths
Atlanta Flames players
Buffalo Bisons (AHL) players
Canadian ice hockey defencemen
Denver Spurs (WHL) players
Erie Blades players
Houston Apollos players
Ice hockey people from Ontario
Kansas City Blues players
Minnesota North Stars players
New Haven Nighthawks players
Peterborough Petes (ice hockey) players
St. Louis Blues players
Sportspeople from Kirkland Lake